Transactions of the American Philological Association (TAPA) is a peer-reviewed academic journal established in 1869 and the official publication of the American Philological Association. It covers the history, culture, and language of ancient Greek and Roman societies. The journal is published biannually by the Johns Hopkins University Press.

External links
 

Classics journals
Publications established in 1869
Johns Hopkins University Press academic journals
Biannual journals
English-language journals
1869 establishments in the United States